Parmotrema is a genus of lichen belonging to the family  Parmeliaceae. It is a large genus, containing an estimated 300 species, with a centre of diversity in subtropical regions of South America and the Pacific Islands.

Members of the genus are commonly called ruffle lichens or scatter-rag lichens.

Description
Parmotrema is characterized by its typically large, moderately to loosely-attached foliose thallus with broad lobes that are usually more than 5 mm wide. There is a broad, naked zone around the margin of the lower surface, an epicortex with pores and an upper cortex with a palisade-plectenchymatous arrangement of hyphae. Ascospores are thick-walled and ellipsoid.

Taxonomy
The genus was proposed as a genus by Italian lichenologist Abramo Bartolommeo Massalongo in 1860, with Parmotrema perforatum as the type species. The genus name, composed of the Greek parmos (cup) and trema (perforation), refers to the perforate apothecia. Parmotrema was largely ignored as a genus, and its species were usually grouped in section Amphigymnia of the large genus Parmelia. Several genera previously segregated from Parmotrema have since been folded back in owing to molecular phylogenetic evidence, including Canomaculina, Concamerella, Parmelaria, and Rimelia.

Gallery

See also
List of Parmotrema species

References

 
Lecanorales genera
Lichen genera
Taxa named by Abramo Bartolommeo Massalongo